The Iglesia de Nuestra Señora de la Candelaria y San Matías is a church in the municipality of Manatí, Puerto Rico.  It was built originally in 1729 and underwent major repairs in 1864 directed by engineer Ramon Soler.

It was listed on the U.S. National Register of Historic Places in 1984.

It is one of 31 churches reviewed for listing on the National Register in 1984.

See also

National Register of Historic Places listings in northern Puerto Rico

References

National Register of Historic Places in Manatí, Puerto Rico
Roman Catholic churches completed in 1729
1720s in Puerto Rico
1720s establishments in the Spanish West Indies
Churches on the National Register of Historic Places in Puerto Rico
Spanish Colonial architecture in Puerto Rico
1729 establishments in New Spain
Roman Catholic churches in Puerto Rico
18th-century establishments in Puerto Rico